This is a list of the first women lawyers and judges in Asia. It includes the year in which the women were admitted to practice law (in parentheses). Also included are the first women in their country to achieve a certain distinction such as obtaining a law degree.
KEY
 AZE = Breakaway state in Azerbaijan
 GEO = Unitary semi-presidential republic in Georgia

Abkhazia (GEO) 

 Nelly Eshba: First female lawyer in Abkhazia
 Kvitsinia Fatima Alekseevna: First female to serve as a Judge of the Arbitration Court of Abkhazia (1997)
 Liudmila Khojashvili, Diana Pilia, and Alisa Bigvava First females appointed as Judges of the Constitutional Court of Abkhazia (2018). Khojashvili is the first female to serve as the Deputy Chairperson (2018) and Chairperson (2021).

Afghanistan 

 Hakime Mustemendi and Enise Imam: First female prosecutors in Afghanistan (c. 1960s)
 Jameela Farooq Rooshna: First female judge in Afghanistan (1969)
 Kimberley Motley (2008): First foreign female lawyer in Afghanistan
 Maria Bashir (1994): First female Prosecutor General in Afghanistan (2009)
 Rehana Popal (2013): First Afghan-born female to practice as a barrister in England and Wales 
Anisa Rasooli: First female to sit on the Supreme Court of Afghanistan (2018)

Armenia 

 Alvina Gyulumyan (b. 1956): First female appointed as a Judge of the Constitutional Court of Armenia (1996) and Judge of the European Court of Human Rights in respect of Armenia (2003)
 Eva Darbinyan: First female appointed as a Judge of the Criminal and Military Appeal Court in Armenia (c. 1999)
 Larisa Alaverdyan: First (female) Human Rights Defender (Ombudsman) of Armenia (2004)
 Elizaveta Danielyan: First female to serve as a Judge of the Criminal Chamber of the Court of Cassation of Armenia (2009)
 Melania Arustamyan: First female to serve as the Head of the Public Defender's Office of the RA Chamber of Advocates (2015)
 Ani Mkhitaryan and Ruzanna Hakobyan: First females appointed to the Supreme Judicial Council of Armenia (2018)
 Lilit Tadevosyan: First female to serve as the President of the Court of Cassation of Armenia (2022)
 Anna Vardapetyan: First female to serve as the Prosecutor General of Armenia (2022)

Artsakh (Nagorno-Karabakh Republic) (AZE) 

 Narine Narimanyan: First female to serve as the President of the Supreme Court of the Republic of Artsakh (2012)

Azerbaijan 

 Bilqeyis Haşımzadə (c. 1940s): First female lawyer in Azerbaijan
 Ayna Sultanova (1895-1938): First female to serve as the Prosecutor General of the Azerbaijan Soviet Socialist Republic (1933–1934)
 Sona Salmanova: First female judge in Azerbaijan (upon her becoming a Judge of the Constitutional Court of Azerbaijan in 1998), as well as the first female Deputy Chairman of the Constitutional Court of Azerbaijan (2005)
 Südaba Hasanova (b. 1947) (1971): First female appointed as the Chairperson of the Supreme Court of Azerbaijan (2000–2005)
 Saadat Rustamova and Lala Huseynova: First female district prosecutors in independent Azerbaijan (2020)

Bahrain 
Fatima Ibrahim Al-Dalal: First female to earn a law degree in Bahrain (1970)
Lulwa Al Awadhi and Haya Rashed Al-Khalifa (1979): First female lawyers in Bahrain
Zahra Ahmed Khalaf: First female lawyer to enter the Board of Directors of the Bahrain Bar Association (1981)
Sheikha Noura bint Abdullah Al Khalifa and Mona Jasem al-Kawari: First two women appointed as Deputy Attorneys General in Bahrain (2003)
Amal Ahmed Abul: First female to serve as a public prosecutor in Bahrain (2003)
 Mona Jasem al-Kawari: First female judge in Bahrain (upon her appointment as a Judge of the High Civil Court of Bahrain in 2006)
Sheikha Noura bint Abdullah Al Khalifa: First female to hold the position of Chief Prosecutor in Bahrain (2007)
Jamila Ali Salman: First female to serve as the President of the Bahrain Bar Association (2007)
Amina Issa Abdullah: First female in Bahrain to serve as a Public Prosecutor in the Juvenile Courts (2006), Chief Public Prosecutor with the rank of judge in the High Court (2009), and judicial inspector (2019) 
Dhouha Ibrahim al-Zayani: First female appointed as a Judge of the Constitutional Court of Bahrain (2007-2016)
Fatima Faisal Hubail: First female appointed as a Judge of the Lower Civil Court of Bahrain (2008) and a member of the Supreme Judicial Council of Bahrain (2013)

Bangladesh 

 Salma Sobhan (1959): First Bangladesh female barrister called to the English Bar
 Rabia Bhuiyan (1967): First female barrister in Bangladesh
 Kamrun Nahar Laily (1972): First female notary in Bangladesh
 Nazmun Ara Sultana (1972): First female judge in Bangladesh (1975), as well as the first female District Judge (1991). She is also the first female High Court Judge (2000) and Justice of the Appellate Division of the Supreme Court of Bangladesh (2011).
 Rehana Khanam: First female Public Prosecutor in Bangladesh (1991)
 Tania Amir (1990): First female to become a member of the Bangladesh Bar Council (2012)
Krishna Debnath: First Hindu female judge in Bangladesh (upon her being appointed as a Justice of the Supreme Court of Bangladesh in 2010)
Jesmin Ara: First female solicitor in Bangladesh (2018)
Sultana Tafadar: First British-born Bangladeshi female to serve as a Queen's Counsel in Great Britain (2022)

Bhutan 

 Tashi Chhozom: First female judge in Bhutan, as well as the first female Justice of the Supreme Court of Bhutan (2012)
Sonam Dechen Wangchuck (Princess Ashi): First (female) to serve as President of the Jigme Singye Wangchuck School of Law (first and currently only law school in Bhutan; 2017) and President of the Bar Council of Bhutan (2017)

Brunei 

 Hayati binti Mohammad Salleh (1980): First Brunei Malay woman called to the English Bar. She later became the first female appointed as a Justice of the Supreme Court of Brunei (2001), as well as the first female Attorney General of Brunei (2009).

Cambodia 

 Kim Lun Khun, Thavry Neth and Thun Leapphy Muong (1995): According to the registry of the Bar Association of the Kingdom of Cambodia, they were the first female lawyers to register in October 1995.
Sum Nipha: First female to serve as a member of the Constitutional Council of Cambodia (2004)
 Kim Sathavy: First female appointed as a Justice of the Supreme Court of the Kingdom of Cambodia (c. 2005)
Dame Silvia Cartwright and Katinka Lahuis: First females to serve as International Judges (Trial and Pre-Trial Chambers respectively) of the Extraordinary Chambers in the Courts of Cambodia (2006)
Lok Chumteav Chea Leang: First female to serve as the Attorney General of the Supreme Court of the Kingdom of Cambodia (2009)
Florence Mumba: First female to serve as an International Judge (Supreme Court Chamber) of the Extraordinary Chambers in the Courts of Cambodia (2010)

China 

 Flora Rosenberg: First female (a Frenchwoman) to practice law in China (c. 1921)
Tcheng Yu-hsiu (1926): First female lawyer in China and Shanghai, China. She later became the first female judge in China.
Kathleen Hoahing (1927): First female solicitor in China 
Ma Yuan: First female to serve as the Vice President of the Supreme People's Court of the People's Republic of China (1985)
 Wei Qihong (c. 1990s): First female lawyer of the Va nationality in China
 Hu Kehui: First female prosecutor in China (upon becoming the Deputy Procurator-General of the Supreme People's Procuratorate in 1998)
 Xue Hanqin: First Chinese female appointed as a Judge of the International Court of Justice (2010)
 Yang Jin (1985): First female lawyer in Tibet

East Timor (Timor Leste) 

 Maria Natércia Gusmão Pereira: First female judge in East Timor (2000). She later became a permanent Judge of the Court of Appeal of East Timor (2011).
 Jacinta Correia de Costa: First female appointed as a Judge of the Court of Appeal of East Timor (2003) and Judge Secretary of the Supreme Judicial Council of East Timor (2012)
 Ana Pessoa Pinto (c. 1981): First female appointed as the Attorney General of East Timor (2007–2013)

Georgia 

 Nino Kipiani: First female lawyer in Georgia
 Firde Nizharadze: First female judge in Georgia (upon her appointment to the Supreme Court of Georgia in 1934). She was also the first female lawyer in Adjara [Autonomous Republic of Adjara, Georgia].
 Lamara Chorgolashvili: First female appointed as a Judge of the Constitutional Court of Georgia (1996)
 Nana Devdarian: First female to serve as the Public Defender of Georgia (2003)
 Eka Tkeshelashvili (1997): First female appointed as the Prosecutor General (or Attorney General) of Georgia (2008)
 Nino Gvenetadze: First female appointed as the Chairperson of the Supreme Court of Georgia (2015)

Hong Kong (CHN) 

 Teo Soon Kim (1927): First female barrister in Hong Kong (admitted to practice law in Hong Kong in 1932)
 Patricia Loseby (1953): First female admitted as a solicitor in Hong Kong
 Ellen Li: First female Justice of the Peace in Hong Kong (1948)
 Cui Zhiying: First female judge in Hong Kong (1976)
 Helen Lo: First female appointed as a District Judge (1986)
 Doreen Le Pichon (United Kingdom Bar, 1969; Hong Kong Bar, 1972; New York Bar, 1987; US District Courts for the Southern and Eastern Districts of New York, 1991): First female appointed as a High Court Judge (1995) and subsequently as a Justice of Appeal Court of Appeal of the High Court of Hong Kong (2000)
 Anna Lai Yuen-kee: First female public prosecutor elevated to Senior Counsel in Hong Kong (2016)
 Baroness Hale (1969) and Beverley McLachlin (1969): First females appointed as Non-Permanent Judges of the Hong Kong Court of Final Appeal (2018)
 Melissa Kaye Pang: First female lawyer appointed as the President of the Law Society of Hong Kong (2018)
 Susan Kwan: First female appointed as Vice President of the Court of Appeal of the High Court of Hong Kong (2019)
 Maggie Yang Mei-kei: First female to serve as the Director of Public Prosecutions for Hong Kong (2021)

India 

 Cornelia Sorabji (1923): First female graduate from Bombay University, first woman to study law at Oxford University, first female advocate in India, and the first woman to practice law in India and Britain
 Mithan Jamshed Lam (1923): First Indian woman barrister and the first Indian woman lawyer at the Bombay High Court 
Omana Kunjamma: First female magistrate in India
 Anna Chandy (1926): First female judge in India (upon her appointment as a Judge of the High Court in India in 1937). She was also the first female judge in the Anglo-Saxon world, decades before Elizabeth Lane.
 Violet Alva: First female lawyer to appear before a High Court in India (1944) and preside over the Rajya Sabha (1952)
 Fathima Beevi (1950): First female appointed as a Justice of the Supreme Court of India (1989)
Leila Seth: First female to become Chief Justice of a High Court in India (upon becoming the Chief Justice of the Himachal Pradesh High Court in 1991). She was also the first female judge on the Delhi High Court (1978). 
Indira Jaising: First female Additional Solicitor General of India (2009) 
Neeru Chadha: First Indian female to serve as a Judge of the International Tribunal for the Law of the Sea (2017) 
Indu Malhotra: First female elevated by the Bar to serve as a Justice of the Supreme Court of India (2018)

Indonesia 

 Anna Lange: First female judge when Indonesia was known as the Netherland Indies (Dutch East Indies) (1921)
Julia Adolfs (1927): First female lawyer when Indonesia was known as the Netherland Indies (Dutch East Indies)
Maria Ulfah Santoso: First Indonesian female to earn a law degree (she graduated from a Dutch university in 1933)
 Ani Abas Manoppo (1952): First female lawyer in Indonesia
 Thung Tjit Nio: First female state judge in Indonesia (1955)
Ny Prayitno: First female appointed as a Judge of the Religious Court in Indonesia through the decree of the Minister of Religion (1957)
 Sri Widoyati Wiratmo Soekito: First female appointed as a Justice of the Supreme Court of Indonesia (1968)
 Ellen Soebiantoro: First female to serve as a Junior Attorney General at the Attorney General's Office of Indonesia
Marianna Sutadi: First (female) Deputy Chief Justice of the Supreme Court of Indonesia (2004)
 Maria Farida Indrati: First female appointed as Judge of the Constitutional Court of Indonesia (2008)
 Sunaryati Hartono (c. 1958): First woman appointed as a Judge of the Country Country Court (Pengadilan Negeril Malang; 1956–1959) East Java

Iran 

 Khadijeh Keshavarz (1937), Yekaterina Saeedkhvanian (1949), and Mehrangiz Manouchehrian (1958): First female lawyers respectively in Iran. Manouchehrian is considered the first woman to actually practice law in Iran. 
 Meymant Chubak, Adineh Bani Mahd Rankouhi, Manijeh Farzad, Azarnoosh Malek, and Homayoundokht Homayoun: First female judges in Iran (1968)
 Roya Najafzadeh: First female prosecutor in Iran (c. 1971)
 Shirin Ebadi: First female to serve as a presiding judge in Iran (1975)
Mina Torabi: First female to serve as a Deputy Prosecutor in Iran (upon becoming one for the Lorestan Province in 1983). She is also the first female judge in the Lorestan Province, Iran (c. 1993).

Iraq 

 Sabiha al-Shaykh Da'ud: First female to graduate with a law degree in Iraq (1941). She registered to become a lawyer in 1956.
 Amina Al-Rahal (1943) and Adiba Taha Al-Shibli (c. 1949): First female lawyers respectively in Iraq
 Zakia Hakki: First female judge in Iraq (1959)

Israel 

 Rosa Ginossar (Ginzburg) (1930): First female lawyer in Israel
 Eugenia Winogradov (1939): First female judge in Israel (1948)
 Miriam Ben-Porat (1945): First female appointed as a Justice of the Supreme Court of Israel (1977)
Dorit Beinisch (1967): First female justice to serve as the President of the Supreme Court of Israel (2006), as well as Israel's first female State Attorney (1989)
 Hana Mansour-Khatib: First female appointed as a Judge of the Shari'a Court in Israel (2017)
 Havi Toker: First ultra-Orthodox female judge in Israel (2018)
 Sawsan Elkassem: First Druze female judge in Israel (2018)
 May Alhajoj: First Bedouin female prosecutor in Israel (2021)
 Gali Baharav-Miara: First female to serve as the Attorney General of Israel (2022)
 Gila Canfy-Steinitz: First female of Sephardic descent appointed as a Justice of the Supreme Court of Israel (2022)

Japan 

 Teruko Sono (Tel Sono): First female to study and practice law in Japan (1874)
 Masako Nakata, Yoshiko Mibuchi, and Ai Kume (1940): First females admitted to practice law in Japan. Nakata later became the first female president of a bar association in Japan.
 Yoshiko Mibuchi (1940) and Mitsuko Ishiwatari (1945): First female judges in Japan (1949). Mibuchi later became the first female to serve as a District Court Judge (1952) and a Chief Judge of the Family Court in Japan (1972).
Chieko Monjo: First female public prosecutor in Japan (1949)
Oshiro Mitsuyo and Noda Aiko: First females to serve as Judges of the High Court in Japan (1974). Aiko later became the first female to serve as the Commissioner of a High Court in Japan (1987). 
Mitsuko Terasawa: First female judge to serve as the President of a District Court in Japan (1983)
Hisako Takahashi: First female appointed as a Justice of the Supreme Court of Japan (1994–1997)
Sato Noriko: First female to serve as a Chief Public Prosecutor in Japan (2001)
Junko Hayashi (2016): First Japanese Muslim (female) lawyer in Japan
Naomi Unemoto: First female to serve as a Superintending Prosecutor in Japan (2022)

Jordan 

 Emily Bisharat: First female lawyer in Jordan
 Taghreed Hikmat: First female judge in Jordan (1996). She later became the first Arab (female) Judge of the International Criminal Court in The Hague (2003–2011). In 2020, she became the first female to serve as a Judge of the Constitutional Court of Jordan.
 Ihsan Barakat: First female appointed as the Chief Justice of the West Amman Court of First Instance (2007), Attorney General (in Amman in 2010), and Judge of the Cassation Court of Jordan (2018)
Ohood Abdullah Majali: First female (a judge) prosecutor in Jordan (2010)

Kazakhstan 

 Nagyima Idryskyzy Arykova: First female to serve as the President of the Supreme Court of Kazakh ASSR (1929–1930)
Aitpaeva Saule Muhanbedianovna (c. 1979): First female lawyer to achieve the rank of (prosecutor) general in Kazakhstan. She is also the first female to have headed a Prosecutor-General's Office's department for the Republic of Kazakhstan (1977).  
Lyudmila Illarionovna Basharimova: First female to serve as a Judge of the Constitutional Court of the Republic of Kazakhstan (1992)
Venera Khamitovna Seitimova: First Kazakh female to serve as a Judge of the Economic Court of the Commonwealth of Independent States (2013)

Kuwait 

 Badria al-Awadhi: First female to study law in Kuwait (c. 1967)
Suad al-Jassim (1973): First female lawyer in Kuwait
Lulwa Ibrahim Al-Ghanim, Hillal Waleed Al-Duraei, Roaa Essam Al-Tabtabai, Bashayer Saleh Al-Raqdan, Basheer Abdul-Jalil Shah Muhammad, Sharifa Abdulaziz Al-Mubarak, Anwar Ahmed Al Bin Ali, Sanabel Badr Al-Houti, Israa Faisal Salim, Fatima Faisal Al-Kandari, Lulwa Khaled Al-Amhoujm Fatima Abdel-Moneim Saghir, Fatima Yaqoub Al-Farhan and Farah Farid Al-Ajeel: First women appointed as judges in Kuwait (2021)
Munira Nabil Al-Waqayan: First female prosecutor to plead a case before a Kuwaiti criminal court (2021). She was one of the 22 female prosecutors appointed for the first time in Kuwait in 2014.

Kyrgyzstan 

 Kydyrbaeva Fatima Chapievna (1945): First female lawyer to become the Chairman of the Supreme Court of the Kirghiz SSR (1942–1947)
Anara Sharshenovna: First Kyrgyz female to serve as a Judge of the Economic Court of the Commonwealth of Independent States (1992)
Cholpon Tursunovna Baekova: First female to serve as the chairperson of the then newly formed Constitutional Court of Kyrgyzstan (1993)
 Aida Salyanova: First female appointed as the prosecutor general of the Kyrgyz Republic (2011–2015)
 Atyr Abdrahmatova: First female to serve as the Ombudsperson of Kyrgyzstan (2021)

Lebanon 

 Salima Abi Rashed (1914): First female lawyer in Lebanon
Paulette Ameslend Tamer (1931): First female law intern of French origin registered in Lebanon
 Nina Trad (1932): First female lawyer registered in Lebanon
 Katina Gholam and Georgette Arbid Chidiac: First female judges in Lebanon (1965)
 Jacqueline Massabki: First female elected to the council of the Lebanese Bar Association (1965)
Arlette Jreissati: First female judge in Lebanon to have received a formal judicial education (1973)
Feryal Hussein Dalloul: First female member of the Supreme Judicial Council of Lebanon (2006)
Micheline Braidy and Janet Nosworthy: First females to serve as Judges of the Special Tribunal for Lebanon (2011)
Amal Haddad: First female to serve as the President of a Bar Association in Lebanon (upon becoming President of the Beirut Bar Association in 2011)
Ivana Hrdličková: First female to serve as the President of the Special Tribunal for Lebanon (2013)
Mireille Emile Najm: First female to serve as a Judge of the Constitutional Council of Lebanon (2021)

Macau (CHN) 

Linxiao Yun (1993): First female barrister in Macau
Florinda Chan and Sonia Chan: First females to serve as the Secretariat for Administration and Justice (Macau) (1999–2014 and 2014–present respectively). Sonia Chan studied law whereas Florinda Chan had a business background.
 Song Man Lei: First female judge in Macau (upon her appointment as a Judge of the Court of Final Appeal of Macau in 2012). She was also the first female appointed as a prosecutor in Macau (1996).

Malaysia 

 B.H. Oon (1927):  First female lawyer in Malaysia
 Tan Sri Dato' Seri Siti Norma binti Yaakob (1962): First female judge in Malaysia (upon her appointment as a Judge of the High Court in 1983). She later became the first female Judge of the Court of Appeal (1994–2000) and first female Chief Judge of Malaysia (2005–2007).
 Ainum Mohd Saaid: First female Attorney General of Malaysia (2001)
 Noor Huda Roslan and Nenney Shuhaidah: First female Judges of the Shari'a High Court in Malaysia (2016)
Tengku Maimun Tuan Mat: First female justice appointed as the Chief Justice of Malaysia (2019)

Maldives 
 Mariya Ahmed Didi: First female lawyer in the Maldives
 Aisha Shujoon Mohamed and Huzaifa Mohamed: First female judges in the Maldives (2007)
Azima Shukoor: First female Attorney General of the Maldives (2007–2008)
Azmiralda Zahir: First female appellate court judge in the Maldives (upon her appointment to the High Court of the Maldives in 2011)
Aishath Bisam: First female appointed as the Prosecutor General of the Maldives (2015)
Aisha Shujoon Mohamed and Azmiralda Zahir: First females to serve as Justices of the Supreme Court of the Maldives (2019)
Dheebanaz Fahmy: First female appointed as a Judge of the Criminal Court of the Maldives (2020)

Mongolia 
 Binjelkh Tserenbaljir (c. 1963): First female lawyer in Mongolia, as well as the first female assistant procurator of Mongolia's State Prosecutor's Office (1968)
Dolgorsuren Khash-Erdene: First female prosecutor trained abroad by the General Prosecutor's Office of Mongolia
 T. Enkhtuya: First female appointed as a Judge of the Aimag Court (1992). She later became the first female Chief Justice of the Civil Court of Appeal and the Court of Appeals of the First Civil Prosecutor's Office in Mongolia.
Tserennadmid Narangiin: First female Prosecutor General of the Aimag (upon serving as the Prosecutor General of the Selenge Aimag Prosecutor's Office from 1993-2001)
Janlavyn Byambajav: First female to serve as a member of the Constitutional Court of Mongolia (1996)
Alimantsetseg Sodon: First female appointed as a Deputy Prosecutor General of Mongolia (2019)
Renchindorji Ononchime: First female to serve as the Chairman of the Judicial General Council of Mongolia (2022)

Myanmar (Burma) 

 Phwar Hmee (1925): First female barrister in Myanmar (Burma) 
 Hme Khin: First female judge in Myanmar (Burma) (1928)
Khin Hla Myint and Daw Kyi: First females to serve as Justices of the Constitutional Tribunal of Myanmar (2011–2012)
Wah Wah Tan: First female to serve as the chief justice of a Myanmar court (2019)
Thida Oo: First female to serve as the Attorney General of Myanmar (2021)

Nepal 

 Shanti Devi Thapa (1961): First female lawyer in Nepal 
 Ambika Acharya: First female judge in Nepal (1966)
 Sharada Shrestha: First female appointed as a Judge of the District Court in Nepal (1967)
 Silu Singh: First female appointed as a Justice of the Supreme Court of Nepal (c. 2001)
 Sushila Karki (1978): First female appointed as the Chief Justice of the Supreme Court of Nepal (2016)
Mohna Ansari (2003): First female Muslim lawyer in Nepal

North Korea 

 Lee Tai-Young (1952): First female lawyer in Korea. She completed her two years of training by 1954, but did not set up a law practice until 1957. She later became a judge.
 Ho Jong-suk: First female to serve as the Chief Justice of the Supreme Court of North Korea (1959)

Oman 
 Suad Al-Lamkia: First female legal advisor in Oman (1974)
Kamilia al Busaidy (1997): First registered female lawyer in Oman
Sahar Askalan: First Omani woman to set up a law firm in Oman
Jalila bint Sulaiman al-Rawahiya: First female to serve as a Director of Public Prosecutions in Oman (Barka; 2008). She was one of the first 16 women appointed as a prosecutor in Oman in 2004.

Pakistan 
 Salma Sobhan (1959): First female lawyer in Pakistan
 Khalida Rashid Khan (1969): First female judge in Pakistan (upon her appointment as a Judge of the Superior Judiciary of Pakistan in 1974)
 Majida Rizvi: First female appointed as a Judge of the High Court of Pakistan (1994)
Noor Naz Agha: First female lawyer to hold an elective office of a bar council in Pakistan (upon becoming the Vice-Chairperson of the Sindh Bar Council in 2005). She also became the first female member of the Judicial Commission of Pakistan in 2017. 
Jalila Haider: First female lawyer from the Hazara community of Balochistan (2010)
Rabia Qari: First female barrister in Lahore, Pakistan. She was also the first female to serve as the President of the Lahore High Court Bar Association (LHCBA).
 Asma Jahangir (1978): First female (a lawyer) to serve as the President of the Supreme Court Bar Association of Pakistan (2010–2012)
 Ashraf Jehan: First female appointed as a Judge of the Federal Shari'a Court in Pakistan (2013)
 Tahira Safdar: First female justice to become a chief justice in Pakistan (upon her appointment as Chief Justice of the Balochistan High Court in 2018). She was also the first female appointed as a civil judge in Balochistan (1982).
Suman Pawan Badani and Diana Kumari: First Hindu females to become civil judges in Pakistan (2019)
Naderat Paracha: First female lawyer from Pakistan to earn a doctorate in Judicial Science (2020)
Ayesha Malik: First female to serve as a Justice of the Supreme Court of Pakistan (2022)

Palestine 

 Freda Slutzkin (1930): First female lawyer in Mandatory Palestine
Saada Fawzi Khalil Kamal Dajani (1967): First female to become a lawyer, prosecutor (1971), judge (1973), Justice of the Supreme Court (1995), and Justice of the Supreme Constitutional Court (2011) in Palestine
Iman Naser Al-Deen: First female appointed as a judge in the Palestinian territories (1982), Senior Judge of the High Judicial Council, and Vice-President of the Supreme Judicial Council in Palestine
Kholoud Al-Faqih (2001) and Asmahan Al-Wuheidi: First females appointed as Judges of the Sharia Court in Palestine (2009)
 Somoud Al-Damiri: First female appointed as the Chief Prosecutor of Personal Status for the Upper Council of Sharia Courts in Palestine (2010)
 Tahreer Hammad: First female appointed as a marriage officiant (Sharia marriage judge) in Palestine (2015)
Najwa Abdullah: First female to serve as a Chief Public Prosecutor in Palestine [upon her appointment to the role in the Salfit Governorate, Palestine in 2016]
Hana Taraz: First Christian female lawyer in Palestine to plead before the Islamic court (2018)

Philippines 

 Floy Gilmore: First female appointed as the Assistant Attorney General of the Philippines (1903)
 Maria del Pilar Francisco de Villacerna (1911): First female lawyer in the Philippines
 Josepha Abiertas: First female law graduate from the Philippine Law School (1920)
 Natividad Almeda-López (1914): First female judge in the Philippines (1934), as well as the first female appointed as a Judge of the Court of Appeals in the Philippines
 Cecilia Muñoz-Palma (1937): First female appointed as a Justice of the Supreme Court of the Philippines (1973). She was the first female district court judge in the Philippines (1954), as well as the first female prosecutor for Quezon City, Philippines (1947).
 Merceditas Gutierrez (1974): First female (a lawyer) appointed as the Ombudsman of the Philippines (2005). She was also the first female to serve as the Secretary of Justice for the Philippines (2002–2003).
 Agnes Devanadera: First female appointed as the Solicitor-General of the Philippines (2007–2010)
 Marian Aleido (1979): First female appointed as the Judge Advocate General of the Armed Forces of the Philippines (2012)
 Maria Lourdes Sereno: First female justice appointed as the Chief Justice of the Supreme Court of the Philippines (2012)
 Miriam Defensor Santiago: First female of Filipino descent elected as a Judge of the International Criminal Court (2012)

Qatar 

 Haifa al-Bakr (2000): First female lawyer in Qatar
Mariam Abdullah Al-Jaber: First female prosecutor in Qatar (upon becoming a District Attorney in 2003)
 Sheikha Maha Mansour al-Thani and Hessa Al-Sulaiti: First female judges in Qatar (2010)
 Fatima Abdullah Al-Mal: First female criminal judge in Qatar (2015)
 Mona Al-Marzouqi: First female appointed as a Judge of the Qatar International Court (2021)

Saudi Arabia 

Souad al-Shammari: First female authorized to defend female cases in the Saudi courts (c. 2012)
Arwa Al-Hujaili (2010): First female trainee lawyer in Saudi Arabia (2013)
 Bayan Mahmoud Al-Zahran (2013): First female lawyer in Saudi Arabia. She later founded the first all-woman law firm in Saudi Arabia in 2014.
 Shaimaa Sadeq Al-Jibran: First female arbitrator (commercial court) in Saudi Arabia (2016)

Singapore 
 Teo Soon Kim (1929): First female lawyer admitted to the Bar in the Straits Settlements
 Jenny Lau Buong Bee (1957): First female judge in Singapore (1966)
 Ong Cheng See (c. 1960s): First woman advocate / solicitor admitted to the Singapore Bar that attended a university within the country
 Phyllis Tan Poh Lian: First female to serve as the President of the Law Society of Singapore (1979)
 Lai Siu Chiu (1973): First woman to serve as a Judicial Commissioner (1991) and the first woman appointed as a Judge of the High Court in the Supreme Court of Singapore (1994)
 Engelin Teh Guek Ngor, Belinda Ang Saw Ean, and Molly Lim Kheng Yan: First females to become Senior Counsel in Singapore (1998)
 Koh Juat Jong (1989): First female appointed as the Solicitor-General of Singapore (2008)
 Judith Prakash: First female appointed as a permanent Judge of the Singapore Court of Appeal (2016)
 Sapna Jhangiani: First female lawyer in Singapore to become a Queen's Counsel (2020)

South Korea 
 Lee Tai-young (1952): First female lawyer in Korea. She completed her two years of training by 1954, but did not set up a law practice until 1957. She later became a judge.
 Hwang Yun-suk (passed a Judicial Examination in 1952): First female judge in South Korea (1954)
Chosun Sook and Park Suk Kyung: First female prosecutors in South Korea (1982)
Lee Young-ae: First female to serve as a Chief Judge in South Korea (upon her appointment as the head of the Suwon District Court in 1988)
Kang Kum-sil: First female to serve as the Attorney General for South Korea (2003)
Chung Hyo-sook: First female appointed as a Judge of the Constitutional Court of South Korea (2003)
Kim Young-ran: First female appointed as a Justice of the Supreme Court of South Korea (2004)
Cho Hee-jin: First female to serve as a Chief Prosecutor in South Korea (c. 2014)

South Ossetia (GEO) 

 Dzhioeva Olga Semyonovna: First female to serve as the Prosecutor of the South Ossetian Autonomous Region (1938)

Sri Lanka 
 Avabai Bomanji Wadia (1934): First Sri Lankan woman to pass the bar examination, but could not find employment as an attorney in Sri Lanka
 Ezlynn Deraniyagala (1935): First female lawyer in Sri Lanka
 Shiranee Tilakawardane: First female judge in Sri Lanka (upon her appointment as a Judge of the High Court in 1988). She is also the first female appointed as a State Counsel (1978), Judge of the Admiralty Court, Justice of the Court of Appeal (1998) and President of the Court of Appeal.
 Shirani Bandaranayake (1983): First female appointed to the Supreme Court of Sri Lanka (1996), went onto become the first female Chief Justice.
 Eva Wansundera (1997): First female to serve as Senior State Counsel, Deputy Solicitor General, Additional Solicitor General, Solicitor General (2011) and Attorney General of Sri Lanka (2011–2012)
Radhika Coomaraswamy: First female to serve as a member of the Constitutional Council of Sri Lanka (2015)

Syria 

 Bouran Al-Tarazi (1937): First female lawyer in Syria
Insaf al-Borai: First female judge in the United Arab Republic (1958; a republic signifying the union of Egypt and Syria from 1958-1971)
 Ghāda Murād: First female judge in Syria (1975). She was also the first female prosecutor in Syria.
 Salwa Kadib: First female to serve as the President of a Court of Assize in Syria (1997) and the Economics Security State Court of Syria (1999)
 Jamila Muslim Al-Sharbaji: First female to serve as a Judge of the Supreme Constitutional Court of Syria (2012)
Zahira Bashmani: First female judge appointed as the President of the Counter-Terrorism Court of Syria (2017)
Khadija Badrakhan: First female judge to serve as the President of the First Court of Appeals in Syria (c. 2017)

Taiwan (CHN) 
 Shi Lijun (1947), Yu Junzhu (1949), and Xiong Dehui (1950): First female lawyers respectively in the Republic of China 
Zhang Jinlan (1942): First female judge in the Republic of China (1948). She later became the first female appointed as a Justice of the Supreme Court of the Republic of China (Taiwan) (1956). In 1970, she became the first female to serve as a Judge of the Judicial Yuan (Constitutional Court) of the Republic of China (Taiwan).
Fan Xinxiang: First female to serve as the Presiding Judge of a Republic of China court (1955), as well as the President of the Supreme Court of the Republic of China (Taiwan) (1970)
Yang Huiying: First Taiwanese female judge in Republic of China (Taiwan) (1968)

Tajikistan 

 Amina Yuldasheva: First female lawyer in the Tajik SSR (c. 1930s)
 N.D. Safarova: First female to serve as a Judge of the Constitutional Court of Tajikistan (1995–2000)
Laili Sharofovna Makhmudova: First Tajik female to serve as a Judge of the Economic Court of the Commonwealth of Independent States (1995)

Thailand 

 Khunying Ram Phrommobon Bunyaprasop (1930): First female lawyer in Thailand
 Chalorjit Jittarutta: First female judge in Thailand (1965)
Yindi Wacharaphong Persuwan: First female appointed as a Judge of the Supreme Court of Thailand (1996). She later served as a Chief Justice for the Supreme Court system. 
Saowanee Asavarot (1973): First female appointed as a Judge of the Constitutional Court of Thailand (2003). She is also considered the first female law professor in Thailand. 
Ubolratana Wudhikapath: First female judge to serve as the President of the Court of Appeal of Thailand (2018)
Methinee Chalothorn: First female appointed to serve as the President of the Supreme Court of Thailand (2020)
Vilawan Mangklatanakul: First Thai national and international female lawyer appointed as a member of the International Law Commission (2021)
Naree Tantasathien: First female Attorney General of Thailand (2022)

Turkey 

 Suat Hilmi Berk (Graduated from Istanbul University Faculty of Law in the early 1920s): First female judge in Turkey (1925)
 Süreyya Ağaoğlu (1925): First female lawyer in Turkey
 Nezahet Güreli and Beyhan Hanım: First females appointed as Judges of the Court of First Instance of Turkey (1930)
 Muazzez Halet Isikpinar: First female criminal judge in Turkey (1931)
 Handan Dalay Kaftancı: First female prosecutor in Turkey
 Melahat Ruacan: First female appointed as a Justice of the Supreme Court of Appeals (Court of Cassation) of Turkey (1945)
 : First female appointed as a Judge of the Supreme Administrative Court of Turkey (c. 1969)
 Nermin Özkaya: First female to serve as the president of a bar association in Turkey (upon her election as the President of the Elazığ Bar Association between 1972-1979)
 Füruzan İkincioğulları: First female to serve as the President of the Council of State of Turkey (1994-1998)
 Işık Keskin Özbay: First female Chief Public Prosecutor of Turkey (1997)
 : First female appointed as a Judge of the Court of Auditors of Turkey
 Aysel Çelikel: First female to become a Dean in a Faculty of Law in Turkey
 Samia Akbulut: First female to serve as a Judge of the Constitutional Court of Turkey (1990)
 Tülay Tuğcu: First female judge to become President of the Constitutional Court of Turkey (2005-2007)
 Şebnem Günaydın: First female to serve as the Secretary General of the Supreme Court of Turkey (2015)
 Filiz Saraç: First woman to be elected president of the Istanbul Bar Association (2022)
 Tuba Ersöz Ünver: First female headscarved woman Provincial Chief Prosecutor in Turkey (2022)

Turkmenistan 
 Gurbanbibi Atajanova: First female appointed as the Prosecutor General of Turkmenistan (1997–2006)

United Arab Emirates 

 Samira Gargash (1991): First female lawyer in the United Arab Emirates
Alia Muhammad Saeed Al Kaabi and Atqa Awad Ali Al Kathiri: First females appointed as public prosecutors in the United Arab Emirates (2007)
 Khulood al Dhaheri:  First female judge in the United Arab Emirates (2008)
Khadija Khamis Al-Malas: First female to serve as an appellate court judge in the United Arab Emirates (2019)
Salama Rashid Al-Ketbi: First female to serve as a Judge of the First Instance Court in the United Arab Emirates (2019)
Alia Muhammad Saeed Al Kaabi: First female to serve as a Public Prosecution Director in the United Arab Emirates (upon her appointment as the Director of the Family Prosecution Office in the Emirate of Abu Dhabi)
Maha Al Mheiri: First female appointed as a common law judge in the United Arab Emirates (2021)

Uzbekistan 

 Khaditcha Suleymanova (1935): First female lawyer in Uzbekistan. She later became the first female to serve as the Chairperson of the Supreme Court of Uzbekistan (1964).

Vietnam 

 Bùi Thị Cẩm: First female lawyer in Vietnam
 Vũ Thị Châu: First female judge in Vietnam (c. 1950s)
Maj. Ann Wansley: First female judge advocate in the U.S. Army, Vietnam (1966–1967)
Le Thi Phuong Hang: First female to serve as a Deputy Chief Justice of the Supreme People's Court of Vietnam (1979-1988)
Nguyễn Thị Tuyết: First female to embark on a legal career in the history of the Military Courts of Vietnam (c. 1980s)
Nguyễn Thị Hoàng Anh: First female (ambassador) appointed as a Justice of the Supreme People's Court of Vietnam (2015)

Yemen 

 Hamida Zakaria: First female judge in Yemen (1968)
Raqia Humaidan (1980): First female lawyer in Yemen
Shada Nasser (1989): First female lawyer to not cover her up face while practicing before Yemen's courts. She was also the first female lawyer in Sana’a, as well as the first female to develop and head an all-female law firm in the same city (1996).
Angham Faisal Qaid: First female to serve as the presiding judge of a Yemeni court (c. 1990)
Samia Abdullah Saeed: First female appointed as a Justice of the Supreme Court of Yemen (2006)
Sabah Alwani: First female to serve as a member of the Supreme Judicial Council of Yemen (2022)

See also 
List of first women lawyers and judges by nationality
 List of first women lawyers and judges in Africa
 List of first women lawyers and judges in Europe
 List of first women lawyers and judges in North America
List of first women lawyers and judges in Oceania
 List of first women lawyers and judges in South America
 List of first women lawyers and judges in the United States
 List of the first women holders of political offices in Asia

References 

Women, Asia
Asia, lawyers
Women, lawyers
law